Aboubaker Rebih (born December 18, 1983 in Koléa) is an Algerian footballer. He currently plays for USM Annaba in the Algerian Ligue Professionnelle 2.

Club career
In July 2010, Rebih signed a one-year contract with CR Belouizdad.

References

External links
 DZFoot Profile
 

1983 births
Living people
Algerian footballers
People from Koléa
Algerian Ligue Professionnelle 1 players
CR Belouizdad players
USM Annaba players
USM Blida players
Algeria A' international footballers
Association football forwards
21st-century Algerian people